Diana Spencer is a professor of classics and Dean of Liberal Arts and Natural Sciences at the University of Birmingham. Her research focuses on how ancient Romans articulate and explore their own identity.

Education 
As an undergraduate, Spencer attended Trinity College, Dublin, where she was awarded a BA (Hons) in Modern English and Classical Civilization in 1991. She completed an MA in Late Antique and Early Byzantine Studies at Royal Holloway, University of London in 1992. Her PhD in Classics, awarded by the University of Cambridge in 1997, focused on the Roman historian Quintus Curtius Rufus. During her time at Cambridge, Spencer was a member of St. John's College.

Career 
Spencer joined the University of Birmingham and was promoted to Senior Lecturer, then to Reader in Roman Intellectual Culture, and finally to Professor. She currently serves as Dean of Liberal Arts and Natural Sciences, and has held the position since the LANS programme was established in 2013. She had previously served as the Director of the University's College of Arts and Law Graduate School.

Spencer was a member of the AHRC's Peer Review College from 2009 to 2013. She is currently a member of the editorial board of the American Journal of Philology and Intertexts, and sits on the Classical Association Journals Board.

Research 
Spencer's research has focused on a broad range of ways in which the ancient Romans understand and explain their own identities. Her "rich and lively" first book explored the importance of Alexander the Great to Roman notions of self. Her second book, Roman Landscape: Culture and Identity, made "a valuable contribution" to the field of understanding how the Romans understood their engagement with the space around them. She has written extensively on how Roman literature articulates ideas of space, motion and movement, as well as how these patterns of speech help formulate and solidify Roman identity.

She has served as an Ambassador at the British School of Rome (2016–19).

Media 
Spencer has appeared on In Our Time as an expert on Alexander the Great.

Selected publications

References

External links 

 University of Birmingham staff profile
 Diana Spencer's Blog, Rome and all that...

Irish women academics
21st-century Irish historians
Classical scholars of the University of Birmingham
Living people
Women historians
Year of birth missing (living people)